5 Seconds of Summer, also known as 5SOS, are an Australian pop rock band formed in 2011 in Sydney, Australia. The group consists of lead vocalist Luke Hemmings, lead guitarist Michael Clifford, bassist Calum Hood, and drummer Ashton Irwin. They have released five studio albums and headlined multiple world tours. All singles from their five studio albums, as well as all five albums, have charted in a substantial number of countries, received multiple official sale certifications and have been featured in a large amount of weekly and year-end charts, as well as making an appearance on decade-end charts.

The band has received numerous accolades and awards including being honored with the prestigious APRA Awards Outstanding International Achievement Award in 2019 and being credited in the exclusive APRA AMCOS' The 1,000,000,000 List in 2020. 5 Seconds of Summer has been placed on Billboard's Top Artists of the 2010s Chart, which lists the most popular and successful artists of the 2010-2019 decade.

4Music Video Honours
The 4Music Video Honours is an annual music awards show by 4Music, a music and entertainment channel in the United Kingdom and available on some digital television providers in the Republic of Ireland.

Alternative Press Music Awards

American Music Awards
The American Music Awards (AMAs) is an annual American music awards show, created by Dick Clark in 1973 for ABC when the network's contract to present the Grammy Awards expired.

Australian Music Prize
The Australian Music Prize (the AMP) is an annual award of $30,000 given to an Australian band or solo artist in recognition of the merit of an album released during the year of award.

APRA Awards (Australia)
The APRA Awards in Australia are annual awards to celebrate excellence in contemporary music, which honour the skills of member composers, songwriters and publishers who have achieved outstanding success in sales and airplay performance.

ARIA Music Awards
The Australian Recording Industry Association Music Awards (commonly known informally as ARIA Music Awards or ARIA Awards) is an annual series of awards nights celebrating the Australian music industry, put on by the Australian Recording Industry Association (ARIA).

ASCAP Awards 
The American Society of Composers, Authors, and Publishers Awards (ASCAP) is an annual American music awards show which honors its top members in seven different music categories.

BBC Radio 1 Teen Awards

Billboard Awards

Billboard Music Awards

Billboard.com Mid-Year Music Awards
Billboard is an American music magazine, headquartered in New York City, New York and owned by Prometheus Global Media.

Billboard Touring Awards

BMI Awards 
The BMI Awards are annual award ceremonies based in the United States, honoring the industry's top songwriters, publishers and top 50 best-performing songs of the year. .

Bravo Otto 
Established in 1957, the Bravo Otto is a German accolade honoring excellence of performers in film, television and music, presented by the Bravo magazine.

Brit Awards

Channel V
The Channel V Oz Artist of the Year was an annual award presented by Channel V Australia. The last award was presented in 2014.

GAFFA Awards

GAFFA Awards (Denmark)
Delivered since 1991, the GAFFA Awards are a Danish award that rewards popular music by the magazine of the same name.

Global Awards

iHeartRadio MMVAs

iHeartRadio Music Awards

iHeartRadio Titanium Awards 
iHeartRadio Titanium Awards are awarded to an artist when their song reaches 1 Billion Spins across iHeartRadio Stations.

JIM Awards

Kerrang! Awards

Meus Prêmios Nick

Most Played Songs Online Awards 
The MPS Online Awards or MOA are online awards presented by music chart page Most Played Songs to give honor and appreciation for artists who have substantial influence in the Philippines and international music scene.

MTV Awards

MTV Europe Music Awards

MTV Italian Music Awards

MTV Spain

MTV UK

MTV Video Music Awards
The American MTV Video Music Awards (VMAs) is an award show by the cable network MTV to honor the top music videos of the year.

MYX Music Awards

Neox Fan Awards

Nickelodeon Kids' Choice Awards

NME Awards

People's Choice Awards

Pollstar Awards

Radio Disney Music Awards

Rockbjörnen

Rock Sound Readers' Poll
Rock Sound Readers' Poll is a poll held by Rock Sound magazine from UK.

Rollers Music Awards
Roller music Awards are Spanish awards that was launched on 1 October 2014.

Rolling Stone Australia Awards
The Rolling Stone Australia Awards are annual awards presented by the Australian edition of Rolling Stone magazine for outstanding contributions to popular culture in the previous year.

Shorty Awards

SSE Live Awards
The SSE Live Awards are an annual music award which are voted and decided by the public, honoring the best live acts of the year at SSE venues.

Teen Choice Awards

Telehit Awards
The Telehit Awards were an annual award show run by the Mexican music channel Telehit.

Vevo Certified

World Music Awards
The World Music Awards were an international awards show founded in 1989 in Monte-Carlo. Awards were presented to the world's best-selling artists and were given based on sales figures provided by the International Federation of the Phonographic Industry (IFPI). The last ceremony was held in 2014.

Young Hollywood Awards

YouTube Creator Awards

Other Accolades

APRA AMCOS’ The 1,000,000,000 List 
On 18 February 2020, 5 Seconds of Summer was awarded and honored in the APRA AMCOS' The 1,000,000,000 List, which recognizes excellence among Australian songwriting artists who have achieved massive international success. The band was awarded for their single, "Youngblood", reaching over a billion streams.

Listicles

References

External links
 

Awards
Lists of awards received by Australian musician
Lists of awards received by musical group